Șar may refer to the following rivers in Romania:

 Șar, a tributary of the Cormoș in Covasna County
 Șar (Mureș), a tributary of the Mureș in Mureș County
 Șar (Tur), a tributary of the Egherul Mare in Satu Mare County